
Gmina Kampinos is a rural gmina (administrative district) in Warsaw West County, Masovian Voivodeship, in east-central Poland.

Villages
Gmina Kampinos contains the villages and settlements of Bieliny, Bromierzyk, Budki Żelazowskie, Grabnik, Granica, Józefów, Kampinos, Kampinos A, Kirsztajnów, Komorów, Koszówka, Kwiatkówek, Łazy, Łazy Leśne, Pasikonie, Pindal, Podkampinos, Prusy, Rzęszyce, Skarbikowo, Stare Gnatowice, Strojec, Strzyżew, Szczytno, Wiejca, Wola Pasikońska and Zawady.

Neighbouring gminas
Gmina Kampinos is bordered by the gminas of Brochów, Leoncin, Leszno, Sochaczew and Teresin.

References

Polish official population figures 2006

Kampinos
Warsaw West County